John Preston Bailey (born May 2, 1951) is a United States District Court judge of the United States District Court for the Northern District of West Virginia.

Education and career

Born in Wheeling, West Virginia, Bailey received an Artium Baccalaureus degree from Dartmouth College in 1973 and a Juris Doctor from West Virginia University College of Law in 1976. He was a law clerk to Judge Charles H. Haden II of the United States District Court for the Northern and Southern Districts of West Virginia from 1976 to 1978. He was in private practice in Wheeling from 1978 to 2007, also serving as an assistant prosecuting attorney of Ohio County from 1985 to 1986, and a special assistant prosecuting attorney of Marshall County from 1985 to 1990.

Federal judicial service

On January 9, 2007, Bailey was nominated by President George W. Bush to a seat on the United States District Court for the Northern District of West Virginia vacated by Frederick Pfarr Stamp Jr. Bailey was confirmed by the United States Senate on March 15, 2007, and received his commission on March 19, 2007. He served as chief judge of the district from 2008 through 2015.

Sources

1951 births
20th-century American lawyers
County prosecuting attorneys in West Virginia
Dartmouth College alumni
Living people
Judges of the United States District Court for the Northern District of West Virginia
Lawyers from Wheeling, West Virginia
United States district court judges appointed by George W. Bush
21st-century American judges
West Virginia lawyers
West Virginia University College of Law alumni